Goodenia gibbosa is a species of flowering plant in the family Goodeniaceae and is endemic to central Australia. It is a prostrate to low-lying, often stoloniferous herb covered with soft hairs. It has elliptic to lance-shaped leaves and small groups of yellow flowers.

Description
It has elliptic to lance-shaped leaves with the narrower end towards the base, at the base of the plant and at the end of stolons. Flowering mainly occurs from May to October and the fruit is a more or less spherical capsule  in diameter.

Taxonomy and naming
Goodenia gibbosa was first formally described in 1980 by Roger Charles Carolin in the journal Telopea from material he collected near the southern end of the Dean Range in the Northern Territory in 1967. The specific epithet (gibbosa) means "swollen" or "pouched", referring to the ovary.

Distribution and habitat
This goodenia grows in sandy soil on dunes and is widely distributed in the drier areas of the Northern Territory, Western Australia and South Australia.

Conservation status
Goodenia gibbosa is classified as "Priority Three" by the Government of Western Australia Department of Parks and Wildlife meaning that it is poorly known and known from only a few locations but is not under imminent threat but as of "least concern" under the Northern Territory Government Territory Parks and Wildlife Conservation Act 1976.

References

gibbosa
Eudicots of Western Australia
Flora of the Northern Territory
Flora of South Australia
Plants described in 1980
Taxa named by Roger Charles Carolin
Endemic flora of Australia